Two tugs launched in 1946 were intended to be named, Empire Doreen

, laid down as Empire Doreen, launched as Nirumund.
, laid down as Empire Doreen, launched as Empire Hedda

Ship names